Piotr Stawarczyk (born 29 September 1983) is a Polish footballer who plays as a centre-back for IV liga side Dalin Myślenice.

Club career
On 6 August 2020, he signed with Hutnik Kraków. He left the club by mutual consent on 23 December 2021.

References

External links
 
 

1983 births
Footballers from Kraków
Living people
Polish footballers
Association football defenders
Okocimski KS Brzesko players
Widzew Łódź players
Ruch Chorzów players
Zawisza Bydgoszcz players
Puszcza Niepołomice players
Hutnik Nowa Huta players
Ekstraklasa players
I liga players
II liga players